Phofsit Daibuun (PSDB) (普實臺文) is an orthography in the Latin alphabet for Taiwanese Hokkien based on Modern Literal Taiwanese. It is able to use the ASCII character set to indicate the proper variation of pitch without any subsidiary scripts or diacritic symbols.

Phonology

Nasalized syllables are indicated by "v" preceding the syllable nucleus. Except for b, j, l, which do not precede nasalized vowels, and m and n, which are already nasals.

Regarding the pronunciation of "oi":
 in southern regions such as Tainan, the pronunciation tends toward oi(1), the mid central vowel ə
 in central and northern regions, the pronunciation tends toward oi(2), the close-mid back unrounded vowel ɤ

Tone spellings
 The table below shows the spelling of the basic tone (7) mid tone, and the four sub-tones (1) high, (5) rising, (3) low falling/low, (2) falling/high falling
 (') indicates a changed tone
 (**) indicates a tone that does not exist in standard Taiwanese

Monophthongs

Diphthongs

Nasal finals

Checked syllables

 # symbol represents characters used for their meaning, rather than their pronunciation

Monophthong

Diphthong

Rarely used vowels

PSDB examples

Universal Declaration of Human Rights

PSDB Greetings

Comparison chart

Notes

External links
PSDB(Phofsit Daibuun) 
Formosa culture(Kun dor guan'de) 

Languages of Taiwan
Romanization of Hokkien
Writing systems introduced in the 20th century